Kevin Krawietz and Horia Tecău defeated Félix Auger-Aliassime and Hubert Hurkacz in the final, 7–6(7–4), 6–4, to win the doubles tennis title at the 2021 Halle Open. It was their first title as a team.

Raven Klaasen and Michael Venus were the defending champions from when the event was last held in 2019, but they did not defend their title together. Klaasen played alongside Ben McLachlan but lost in the second round to Andrés Molteni and Guido Pella. Venus played alongside Tim Pütz but lost in the semifinals to Auger-Aliassime and Hurkacz.

Seeds

Draw

Finals

Top half

Bottom half

Qualifying

Seeds

Qualifiers
  Daniel Masur /  Rudolf Molleker

Lucky losers
  Yannick Hanfmann /  Dominik Koepfer

Qualifying draw

References

External links
 Main draw
 Qualifying draw

Doubles